These are the Canadian number-one albums of 2021. The chart is compiled by Nielsen SoundScan and published in Billboard magazine as Top Canadian Albums.

Number-one albums

See also
List of Canadian Hot 100 number-one singles of 2021
List of number-one digital songs of 2021 (Canada)

References

External links
 Billboard Top Canadian Albums

2021
Canada Albums
2021 in Canadian music